Adventure in Diamonds is a 1940 American crime film directed by George Fitzmaurice and starring George Brent, Isa Miranda, John Loder and Nigel Bruce. It was also released under the alternative title of Diamonds are Dangerous.

Critics noted similarities in the plot with Desire (1936) produced by the same studio, which had starred Marlene Dietrich. It was part of an attempt to build up Isa Miranda as a European star in the style of Dietrich and Greta Garbo. It was the second of two films Miranda made in Hollywood before returning to her native Italy.

Plot summary

Captain Stephen Dennett of the Royal Air Force is on board a passenger airliner en route to South Africa, when he meets the beautiful and glamorous Felice Falcon. He is unaware of the fact that Felice is an accomplished jewel thief, travelling with her partner in crime, Michael Barclay. The two of them have made a plan for a heist in the South African mines - stealing a shipment of diamonds and escaping unnoticed. The diamonds are already cached by one of Felice’s accomplices, but she needs a way to get into the restricted mine area without raising suspicion. That is where the unfortunate and clueless captain comes into the picture. Felice decides to use him for her own benefit, charming him to promise to get her into the forbidden area using his status as a military officer.

The Captain isn’t that easily fooled though, and with his own agenda, he ends up with the stolen jewels himself. He decides to frame the two thieves, and makes contact with his acquaintance, the police commissioner Colonel J.W. Lansfield. He turns the jewels over to the Colonel, who has been set on catching Barclay for a long time, and he sets a trap with the diamond jewels. However, the plan backfires, and Felice is caught in the trap instead of Barclay. She is sentenced to prison, but is offered a parole by the Colonel if she agrees to help out catching a new ring of jewel thieves operating in the area. She is to pretend to be Stephen’s new wife, and the two of them are supposed to deliver the stolen jewels to the new gang.

While they wait to be contacted by the gang, Felice and Stephen spend some quality time together, and Felice falls in love with Stephen for real. She decides to renounce her criminal past and start anew. When the gang eventually make contact, it turns out that the leader is Felice’s old accomplice Barclay, and their cover is instantly blown. They have to be rescued by the colonel and his men, but Felice is permanently out of prison and can start her new life with Stephen.

Cast

 George Brent as Captain Dennett
 Isa Miranda as Felice Falcon
 John Loder as Michael Barclay
 Nigel Bruce as Colonel Lansfield
 Elizabeth Patterson as Nellie
 Matthew Boulton as Lloyd
 Rex Evans as Jimmy
 Cecil Kellaway as Emerson
 Walter Kingsford as Wakefield
 Ernest Truex as 	Toutasche
 Ralph Forbes as 	Mr. Perrins
 Genia Nikolaieva as Mrs. Perrins
 Charles Irwin as Nelson
 E.E. Clive as 	Mr. MacPherson
 Vera Lewis as 	Mrs. MacPherson
 Edward Gargan as 	Lou
 David Clyde as Bartender
 Rex Downing as 	Buttons 
 Roger Gray as Sergeant at Airport
 Virginia Lee Corbin as 	Nightclub Woman

References

Bibliography
 Gundle, Stephen. Mussolini's Dream Factory: Film Stardom in Fascist Italy. Berghahn Books, 2013.

External links
 
 

1940 films
1940 crime films
American crime films
Films directed by George Fitzmaurice
Films scored by George Antheil
Films set in South Africa
Films with screenplays by Franz Schulz
American black-and-white films
Paramount Pictures films
1940s English-language films
1940s American films